Andrus Veerpalu (born 8 February 1971) is a retired Estonian cross-country skier. He is Estonia's most successful Winter Olympian, having won the gold medal in men's 15 km classical in 2002 and 2006, and silver in men's 50 km classical in 2002.

Career
On 17 February 2006 Veerpalu won his second Winter Olympics gold medal (in 15 km cross country skiing; his previous gold medal is from the Salt Lake City games), becoming the fourth Estonian to have won two Olympic gold medals (Kristjan Palusalu, Erika Salumäe and Kristina Šmigun-Vähi are the first three). He is the most successful Olympic athlete from Estonia with three medals. (Kristina Šmigun-Vähi tied that record at the 2010 Vancouver Winter Olympics)

Veerpalu has also found success at the FIS Nordic World Ski Championships, winning a gold at 15 km in 2009 at Liberec, 30 km in 2001 at Lahti and a silver at 50 km in 1999 at Ramsau. He has also won the 50 km event at the Holmenkollen ski festival in 2003 and 2005. Veerpalu also competed in the men's 50 km, Mass Start Classic at the 2010 Winter Olympics, finishing at the 6th place.

Veerpalu became the oldest world champion in history with his victory at Liberec 2009 on the 15 km classical event. He was then 38 years old. He is also the oldest Olympic champion in individual distance.

Veerpalu earned the Holmenkollen medal in 2005, the first Estonian to do so.

Veerpalu is the fourth athlete to compete in cross-country skiing at six Winter Olympics, after Marja-Liisa Kirvesniemi, Harri Kirvesniemi, and Jochen Behle. (Kateřina Neumannová is also a cross-country skier who competed at six Olympics, but one of her appearances was in cycling.)

On 23 February 2011, Veerpalu announced that he will end his professional sportsman career due to a chronic knee injury.

Doping case acquittal

Several months after Veerpalu's retirement it was announced that he had tested positive for HGH (growth hormone), however he had pleaded innocent in HGH treatment. Estonian biochemistry doctors explained that the verdict was untimely and that there was no reliable method to distinguish artificial HGH from natural background hormone. Veerpalu appealed the test result to the FIS.
The FIS antidoping commission found Veerpalu guilty and extended his ban to three years, due to Veerpalu's team's lack of co-operation with FIS. A group of top Estonian biochemists investigated the matter and insist Veerpalu was a false positive. The Court of Arbitration for Sport acquitted Veerpalu, lifted his doping ban and ordered the FIS to pay a part of Veerpalu's court costs on 25 March 2013. 
The court stated "that there are many factors in this case which tend to indicate that the Athlete did in fact himself administer exogenous hGH" but found that the decision limit, the threshold for considering the result an adverse analytical finding, was not sufficiently reliable to uphold the doping conviction. Krista Fischer, a senior researcher for the Estonian Genome Center, questioned what these unexplained factors hinted at by CAS could be: "So what were these factors? Right now the only numbers that seem to hint at doping are the same four numbers that have been ruled invalid."

Cross-country skiing results
All results are sourced from the International Ski Federation (FIS).

Olympic Games
 3 medals – (2 gold, 1 silver)

World Championships
3 medals – (2 gold, 1 silver)

World Cup

Season standings

Individual podiums
6 victories – (6 ) 
11 podiums – (11 ) 

Note:  Until the 1999 World Championships, World Championship races were included in the World Cup scoring system.

Personal life
He is married to Angela Veerpalu and they have five children.

See also
List of athletes with the most appearances at Olympic Games

References

External links

 
  – click Holmenkollmedaljen for downloadable pdf file 
  – click Vinnere for downloadable pdf file 
 13 June 2012, Veerpalu Court Hearing Ends Today, Estonian Public Broadcasting News
 28 August 2012, Veerpalu Appeal Decision Delayed, Estonian Public Broadcasting News
 28 February 2013, Judgement Day for Veerpalu Doping Case: Result Expected Shortly, Estonian Public Broadcasting News
 28 February 2013, Decision in Veerpalu Doping Case Postponed, The ruling will now come on March 25, ETV reported, Estonian Public Broadcasting News
 Lausanne, 1 March 2013, Court of Arbitration for Sport: VEERPALU/FIS CASE: DECISION POSTPONED TO 25 MARCH 2013 
 Estonian Public Broadcasting: 25. March 2013, Veerpalu Decision Expected (Again)
 26.03.2013, The Court of Arbitration for Sport (CAS): CROSS-COUNTRY SKIING - CASE VEERPALU/ FIS: APPEAL UPHELD, tas-cas.org
 FIS-Ski: CAS issues decision in the case of Veerpalu, fis-ski.com
 Lausanne, 26 March 2013, The Court of Arbitration for Sport (CAS) MEDIA RELEASE, CROSS-COUNTRY SKIING, CASE VEERPALU/FIS
 CAS 2011/A/2566 Andrus Veerpalu v. International Ski Federation, ARBITRAL AWARD
 
 
 

1971 births
Living people
Sportspeople from Pärnu
Estonian male cross-country skiers
Cross-country skiers at the 1992 Winter Olympics
Cross-country skiers at the 1994 Winter Olympics
Cross-country skiers at the 1998 Winter Olympics
Cross-country skiers at the 2002 Winter Olympics
Cross-country skiers at the 2006 Winter Olympics
Cross-country skiers at the 2010 Winter Olympics
Holmenkollen medalists
Holmenkollen Ski Festival winners
Olympic cross-country skiers of Estonia
Olympic gold medalists for Estonia
Olympic silver medalists for Estonia
Olympic medalists in cross-country skiing
FIS Nordic World Ski Championships medalists in cross-country skiing
Medalists at the 2006 Winter Olympics
Medalists at the 2002 Winter Olympics
Recipients of the Order of the White Star, 1st Class